This is a list of hospitals in Pennsylvania, a U.S. state. The list includes only hospitals that are currently licensed by the Pennsylvania Department of Health or operated the Veterans Health Administration according to data collected by the Hospital and Healthsystem Association of Pennsylvania (HAP) and the Pennsylvania Department of Health.

As of July 2018, there were 249 state licensed hospitals and VA hospital facilities in Pennsylvania. 148 of these facilities were non-profit, 86 were for-profit or "investor-owned", and 15 were public hospitals owned by the Federal government, state government, or in one case, the city of Philadelphia.  There were 42,817 total licensed beds and 1,880 total operating rooms. 156 were general acute hospitals (with 10 more classified as general acute specialty hospitals), 29 were psychiatric hospitals, 22 were long-term acute care hospitals, 21 were rehabilitation hospitals, and 7 were VA hospitals. The largest hospital by both beds and operating rooms was UPMC Presbyterian-Shadyside in Pittsburgh. The University of Pittsburgh Medical Center (UPMC) was also the largest health system network in the state by number of hospitals (28), beds (7,022), and operating rooms (379).

Hospitals in Pennsylvania

The following list is initially sorted alphabetically and can be sorted by additional categories. Hospital names are the latest as provided to HAP in their July 2018 dataset and may not reflect the current name or the name used by the hospital for marketing purposes. See the Notes column for additional information.

Hospitals planned or under construction
The following list of new hospitals are those that have been announced as planned or are currently under construction as of August 28, 2019. This list represents new hospital locations or campuses and does not include the expansion or replacement of existing hospital facilities.

See also
List of hospitals in Philadelphia
List of hospitals in Pittsburgh

References

Pennsylvania
 
Hospitals